The Red Sea Flotilla (Flottiglia del mar rosso) was part of the Regia Marina Italia (Italian Royal Navy) based at Massawa in the colony of Italian Eritrea, part of Italian East Africa. During World War II, the Red Sea Flotilla was active against the East Indies Station of the Royal Navy from the Italian declaration of war on 10 June 1940 until the fall of Massawa on 8 April 1941.

The squadron was isolated from the main Italian bases in the Mediterranean by distance and British dispositions. The British capture of Massawa and other Italian ports in the region ended the Italian naval presence in the region in April 1941.

Purpose and organisation

On 10 June 1940, the Red Sea Flotilla had seven destroyers in two squadrons, a squadron of five Motor Torpedo Boats (MAS, Motoscafo Armato Silurante) and eight submarines in two squadrons. The main base was at Massawa, with other bases at Assab (also in Eritrea) and Kismayu, in southern Italian Somaliland. The Red Sea Flotilla was not used aggressively by the Italians but the British viewed it as a potential threat to Allied convoys travelling East African waters between the Mediterranean Sea and the Indian Ocean. This was a vital route for British forces operating from Egypt. The Red Sea Flotilla was especially well situated to attack convoys headed from the Gulf of Aden through the Red Sea to the Suez Canal, after the Mediterranean was closed to Allied merchant ships, which had to take passage around the Cape of Good Hope.

Actions

Several attempts were made to stage offensive actions against the British Royal Navy and Allied convoys from Massawa.  Some of the earliest failed when submarine air conditioning systems, intended to reduce temperatures in the warm water of the Red Sea proved dangerous under wartime operating conditions. Leakage of chloromethane refrigerants caused central nervous system poisoning in the recirculating air during submerged operations and about twelve sailors died aboard . The submarines  and  ran aground while their crews were intoxicated by chloromethane and the latter could not be salvaged. The submarines ,  and  struck early; Galileo Galilei sank the Norwegian freighter James Stove off Djibouti, before British counter-measures forced the submarines to depart the area.

Torricelli was spotted on 23 June, while approaching Massawa and an intensive search was conducted by four warships aided by aircraft from Aden. After fierce resistance, during which the sloop  was damaged by return fire, Torricelli was sunk. After the engagement, the destroyer  was destroyed by an internal explosion. As a mark of respect for the gallantry of the Torricelli crew, the Italian captain was guest of honour at a dinner at the British naval base. Galileo Galilei had also been found on 18 June, captured and taken to Aden on the same day. Galvani sank  at the same time that her sisters were fighting and was sunk on the following day.

In October 1940, the destroyers based at Massawa conducted an attack on the 32-ship Convoy BN 7.

As Italian fuel stocks at Massawa dwindled, the offensive capability of the Red Sea Flotilla declined. The vessels of the flotilla became a "fleet in being", offering a threat without action and rarely left port. Engine problems kept Battisti in port, where she was subsequently scuttled to prevent her capture by the British. The Italian ships were spotted by aircraft while en route and came under attack from land and carrier based aircraft. Pantera and Tigre were scuttled on the Arabian coast while Manin and Sauro were sunk by Fairey Swordfish aircraft. On 8 April 1941, the light cruiser  was torpedoed and crippled by the Italian torpedo boat MAS 213 off Massawa. The cruiser was out of action until June 1942.

The armed merchant cruisers ,  and the colonial dispatch ship  were ordered to escape and reach Japan. Ramb II and Eritrea reached Kobe but Ramb I was intercepted and sunk by Leander. The four Italian submarines that had survived were ordered to join BETASOM the Italian submarine flotilla at Bordeaux and succeeded, despite concerted British attempts to intercept them. On 8 April 1941, Massawa fell to the British and the Red Sea Flotilla ceased to exist. Few vessels of the flotilla survived the East African Campaign.

Order of battle

Destroyers
Seven destroyers were organised into two divisions:
 3rd Destroyer Division (All  (1,600 ton full load displacement))
  – Crippled by HMS Kimberley and  eventually destroyed by RAF 22 November 1940
  – Bombed and sunk by 813 and 824 Naval Air Squadrons at 06:15 3 April 1941 in position 
  – scuttled after engine breakdown 3 April 1941.
  – Sunk by RAF 3 April 1941 in position 
 5th Destroyer Division (All   (2,600 ton full load displacement)) 
  – Scuttled 3 April 1941 after being damaged by RAF
  – Scuttled 3 April 1941 after being damaged by RAF
  – Ran aground and scuttled 1 April 1941 in position

MAS (Motor torpedo boats)
The five MAS were organised as follows:
 21st MAS Squadron
 MAS 204 – Lost due to mechanical failure
 MAS 206 – Lost due to mechanical failure
 MAS 210 – Lost due to mechanical failure
 MAS 213 – Scuttled 8 April 1941
 MAS 216 – Lost due to mechanical failure

VIII Submarine Group

 81st Submarine Squadron
  (896/1,265 tons displacement) – Sailed to Bordeaux, France and arrived 6 May 1941
  (880/1,230 tons displacement) – Sailed to Bordeaux, France and arrived 9 May 1941
  (880/1,230 tons displacement) – Captured 19 June 1940
  (896/1,265 tons displacement) – Sunk 24 June 1940
 82nd Submarine Squadron
  (620/855 tons displacement) – Sailed for Bordeaux, France, arrived 20 May 1941
  (620/855 tons displacement) – Ran aground and scuttled 15 June 1940
  (880/1,230 tons displacement) – Sailed for Bordeaux, France, arrived 7 May 1941
  (880/1,230 tons displacement) – Sunk 23 June 1940

Other vessels
 Colonial ship  (2,170 tons displacement) – Sailed to Kobe, Japan, and turned to the Allies in Columbo, Ceylon, when Italy capitulated in September 1943
 Torpedo boat  (670 tons displacement) – Scuttled 8 April 1941
 Torpedo boat  (670 tons displacement) – Scuttled in the mouth of the harbour at Massawa as a blockship after suffering heavy bomb damage
 Gunboat G. Biglieri (620 tons displacement) – Captured
 Gunboat Porto Corsini (290 tons displacement) – Scuttled
 Minelayer Ostia (620 tons displacement) – Sunk by British Royal Air Force attack within the harbour at Massawa; all mines still racked
 Auxiliary cruiser  (3,667 tons displacement) – Sailed to Kobe, Japan.  Lost 27 February 1941 in battle against the light cruiser .
 Auxiliary cruiser  (3,667 tons displacement) – Sailed to Kobe, Japan, and placed into the service of the Imperial Japanese Navy when Italy surrendered
 Hospital ship Aquileia – former  – Captured and placed into the service of the British Royal Navy

See also
 Italian Royal Navy
 List of Italian destroyers

Notes

Footnotes

References

Books

Websites

Further reading
 
 

History of the Red Sea
Red Sea
Red Sea
Red Sea
Red Sea
Red Sea
East African campaign (World War II)